Chestnut Grove School may refer to:

in England
Chestnut Grove Academy, formerly Chestnut Grove School, a school in London

in the United States
Chestnut Grove Elementary School, a school in Decatur, Alabama
 Chestnut Grove School (Athens, Georgia), listed on the NRHP in Georgia